Kieren Gallear also known as DELS (pronounced "Dels") is a British art director, recording artist, rapper, graphics designer and filmmaker born in Ipswich, England, currently based in London. Gallear signed with the Ninja Tune imprint Big Dada in May 2010.

GOB (2011)
DELS has released three singles, "Shapeshift", "Trumpalump" (produced by Hot Chip's Joe Goddard) and "GOB" (produced by Kwes), in 2010 and 2011. His debut album GOB (2011) was produced by Kwes, with Micachu engineering two tracks and Joe Goddard three tracks. DELS met all three producers via Myspace when the social networking site was at its peak of popularity.

Critical acclaim
DELS was described as the "Future of UK Hip Hop" by British national newspaper The Times in their "Ones to Watch 2011" list in January 2011. Paul Lester of The Guardian has complimented Dickins for his ability to set himself apart from many homogeneous hip-hop artists by sounding both languid and urgent. Lester has described Dickins as "Dizzee mixed with the Björk of Vespertina". DELS has received positive media coverage from BBC Radio 1 and 6 Music DJs such as Zane Lowe, Annie Mac, Huw Stephens, Reggie Yates, Huey Morgan and Lauren Laverne. DELS' single "Shapeshift" was listed by Dazed & Confused and Drowned in Sound as one of their top singles of 2010.

Petals Have Fallen (2014)
Gallear's second album, Petals Have Fallen, was released on 3 November 2014. He said:

Personal life
DELS is a fan of football club Arsenal and Japanese anime.

Discography

Studio albums

GOB (2 May 2011)
Petals Have Fallen (3 November 2014)

EPs

Black Salad (2012)

Singles

Guest appearances
 Kwesachu Mixtape Vol.1 (2010)
 Eyesdown (Remix) (w/ Bonobo & Andreya Triana) (2011)
 Kwesachu Mixtape Vol.2 (2012)

Filmography

Music videos
 "You Live in My Head" (DELS) 2012
 "Right Thing" (Rosie Lowe) 2013

References

External links
 
 DELS on Ninja Tune

1985 births
Living people
Musicians from Ipswich
English hip hop musicians
Ninja Tune artists
Big Dada artists
Black British male rappers